The 1958 Delaware State Hornets football team represented Delaware State College—now known as Delaware State University—as a member of the Central Intercollegiate Athletic Association (CIAA) in the 1958 NCAA College Division football season. Led by coach Bennie J. George in his third and final year, the Hornets compiled a 3–5 record, and were outscored 118–168.

Schedule

References

Delaware State
Delaware State Hornets football seasons
Delaware State Hornets football